IBC TV X-Press was an afternoon newscast of IBC 13. It aired from July 10, 1995, to August 15, 1997, replacing IBC News 5:30 Report and was replaced by Headline Trese.

Anchors
Amy Godinez-Cuenco
Elmer Mercado

See also
List of programs previously broadcast by Intercontinental Broadcasting Corporation
IBC News and Public Affairs

Intercontinental Broadcasting Corporation news shows
IBC News and Public Affairs
Intercontinental Broadcasting Corporation original programming
1990s Philippine television series
1995 Philippine television series debuts
1997 Philippine television series endings
Filipino-language television shows
Philippine television news shows